The Hip Hop Film Festival is the first film festival in the world to focus on producers, directors and writers from the global culture of Hip Hop.  The Hip Hop Film Festival was founded in 2015 by CR Capers, the CEO & Founder of the Harlem Film House. The Hip Hop Film Festival has featured Master Cyphers by Academy Award-Winning Producer Bruce Cohen, Harlem Legend Dapper Dan, Actor and Entrepreneur Theo Rossi, Director Stefon Bristol and REVOLT CEO Detavio Samuels among others.

Awards 2019

Awards 2018

References

Film festivals established in 2015